The 2000 Acura Classic was a women's tennis tournament played on outdoor hard courts in San Diego in the United States. It was part of Tier II of the 2000 WTA Tour. The tournament was held from July 31 through August 6, 2000. Third-seeded Venus Williams won the singles title.

Finals

Singles

 Venus Williams defeated  Monica Seles, 6–0, 6–7, 6–3
 It was Williams's 3rd singles title of the year and the 12th of her career.

Doubles

 Lisa Raymond /  Rennae Stubbs defeated  Lindsay Davenport /  Anna Kournikova, 4–6, 6–3, 7–6
 It was Raymond's 4th title of the year and the 22nd of her career. It was Stubbs's 4th title of the year and the 25th of her career.

External links
 ITF tournament edition details
 WTA tournament draws

Acura Classic
Southern California Open
Toshiba Classic
2000 in American tennis